Oshnavieh-ye Jonubi Rural District is in Nalus District of Oshnavieh County, West Azerbaijan province, Iran. At the National Census of 2006, its population was 4,272 in 730 households. There were 4,245 inhabitants in 1,170 households at the following census of 2011. At the most recent census of 2016, the population of the rural district was 4,117 in 1,084 households. The largest of its 16 villages was Deh Shams-e Bozorg, with 779 people.

References 

Oshnavieh County

Rural Districts of West Azerbaijan Province

Populated places in West Azerbaijan Province

Populated places in Oshnavieh County